Apollonia 6 is the only studio album by R&B vocal trio and Prince protégées Apollonia 6.

The album was initially to be the second release by the Prince-formed group Vanity 6, but when lead singer Vanity departed Prince's camp, the musician hired Apollonia Kotero and changed the group's name.

Apollonia 6 primarily features the vocals of Kotero and Brenda Bennett with backing vocals by Wendy & Lisa and Jill Jones. (Susan Moonsie only recorded one song for this album.) The album spawned one hit, "Sex Shooter", which was performed by the group in the film Purple Rain.

Although the album was released primarily on vinyl and audio cassette (Warner Bros. 25108), a CD version was released in Japan in 1990 (WPCP-3701). When Warner Bros. initially opted not to issue the album on CD, it became a highly sought-after collectible and was later pirated. It was later released in the US, but was not made available via streaming and digital platforms.

Apollonia 6 had a fair chart run, and is considered by some to be a viable part of the Minneapolis sound.

Track listing

1. All the songs on this album were actually written by Prince, but the songwriting credits were given to the group's members.

Personnel
 Vocals: Apollonia Kotero, Susan Moonsie, Brenda Bennett
 Multi-instruments: Prince & The Revolution
 Guitars: Wendy Melvoin
 Keyboards: Lisa Coleman
 Bass: Mark Brown
 Drums, percussion: Sheila E.
 Additional backing vocals: Jill Jones, Susannah Melvoin

Production
 Produced by Prince (as The Starr ★ Company)
 Recorded, engineered and mixed by Peggy McCreary & The Starr ★ Company
 Mastered by Bernie Grundman

Singles

Cover versions
"Sex Shooter" was covered by T.H.E.M. Thee Human Ego Maniacs in 2002, by both Firefox and Coco Electrik in 2006, by Frost in 2008, and by both Erika Jayne and Cahill featuring Nikki Belle in 2009.

"Oo She She Wa Wa" was covered by Snax featuring Peaches on his 2004 LP From the Rocking Chair to the Stage, released on Mental Groove Records.

References

1984 debut albums
Apollonia 6 albums
Albums produced by Prince (musician)
Warner Records albums
Albums recorded at Sunset Sound Recorders